The black laughingthrush (Melanocichla lugubris) is a species of bird in the family Timaliidae. It is found in highland forests in the Thai-Malay Peninsula and on the Indonesian island of Sumatra. Until recently, it usually included the bare-headed laughingthrush as a subspecies.

Gallery

References

External links
 Black laughingthrush video on the Internet Bird Collection

black laughingthrush
Birds of the Malay Peninsula
Birds of Sumatra
black laughingthrush
Taxa named by Salomon Müller
Articles containing video clips
Taxonomy articles created by Polbot
Taxobox binomials not recognized by IUCN